USS Tippecanoe may refer to the following ships operated by the United States:

, was a  monitor launched in 1864, renamed Vesuvius and then Wyandotte in 1869, and decommissioned in 1898.
, was a  fleet replenishment oiler launched in 1920, commissioned in 1940, and decommissioned in 1946
 is a  underway replenishment oiler in service since 1993

United States Navy ship names